The Rio das Lontras Private Natural Heritage Reserve is a private natural heritage reserve in the state of Santa Catarina, Brazil.

Location

The Rio das Lontras Private Natural Heritage Reserve was created by decree on 3 April 2005, modified on 14 May 2009.
The decree creating the reserve, which had not yet been surveyed, said it had .
It includes land in the municipalities of São Pedro de Alcântara and Águas Mornas in the state of Santa Catarina.

Re reserve's streams supply the Forquilhas River, a tributary of the Cubatão River.

Environment

The reserve covers a fragment of the Atlantic Forest biome.
It has rugged terrain with very well preserved dense montane rainforest and has a rich variety of trees, orchids, ferns and other flora. 
Fauna include anteaters, raccoons, coatis, armadillos, skunks, opossum, hedgehogs, squirrels, howler monkeys, ocelots, pumas and otters. Birds include weavers, toucans, woodpeckers, tanagers, jays, thrushes, ibises and hummingbirds.

Conservation

The objectives are to preserve the environment and enable scientific research and environmental education.
The proprietors make a small income from sale of T-shirts.

Notes

Sources

2005 establishments in Brazil
Protected areas of Santa Catarina (state)
Private natural heritage reserves of Brazil